Emiliano Daniel Romero (born 9 November 1985) is an Argentine professional footballer who plays as a midfielder for Primera B Metropolitana side Talleres.

Club career
He played almost his entire professional career in Argentina. 
In June 2011, after almost miraculously saved from having to play a promotion relegation to the Primera B Metropolitana, with the 2–1 win over Rosario Central whereas Romero scored two goals, Defensa y Justicia are beginning to think about the next season of the Primera B Nacional. At that time, Emiliano Romero, who had a great tournament and even wore the captain's armband, is highly sought after by clubs in the Primera B Nacional, but especially from Argentine Primera División clubs.  
As a result, he signs to Olimpo in Primera División on loan from Defensa y Justicia.

In June 2013, he left from Argentina, signing to Everton of the Primera B de Chile in Chile, on loan from Defensa y Justicia. He made his debut with Everton in Sausalito Stadium, playing his first pre-season friendly game against Colo-Colo, losing 2–0. Besides his first game with the club Romero's media criticism was good.  The newspaper La Estrella said: "Emiliano Romero in driving the ball, became a headache for the defense led by Omar Labruna."

The player who will fill the void left by Nicolás Martínez seems to found the Greek Super League club Panetolikos, as Emiliano Romero, is expected in the next hours to Agrinio to complete his move. On 19 July 2015, Romero signed a two-year contract with Panetolikos for an undisclosed fee. On 12 January 2016, Panetolikos and Romero parted ways by mutual consent. On the same day, Liga de Fútbol Profesional Boliviano club Oriente Petrolero announced the signing of Romero. He returned to Argentine football to join Primera B Metropolitana side Talleres in January 2017.

References

External links
 Profile at BDFA 
 

1985 births
Living people
Argentine footballers
Argentine expatriate footballers
Defensa y Justicia footballers
Olimpo footballers
Club Atlético Platense footballers
Everton de Viña del Mar footballers
Chilean Primera División players
Argentine Primera División players
Bolivian Primera División players
Primera B Metropolitana players
Atlético de Rafaela footballers
Expatriate footballers in Chile
Panetolikos F.C. players
Oriente Petrolero players
Talleres de Remedios de Escalada footballers
Association football midfielders
People from Avellaneda Partido
Sportspeople from Buenos Aires Province